"An Honest Mistake" is a song by American rock band the Bravery. It was released as their debut single and the lead single from their self-titled studio album on February 28, 2005. The song peaked at number seven on the UK Singles Chart and number 33 on the Irish Singles Chart.

"An Honest Mistake" was also featured on the soundtrack of the video games Burnout Revenge (as a remix) and MVP Baseball 2005; in MVP, the song is listed as "Honest Mistake". The song is also featured in the video game True Crime: New York City, in The O.C. season 2 finale "The Dearly Beloved" and in the CSI: NY season 2 episode "Youngblood". The song is playable on the UK version of the game SingStar Rocks!. It was also played in the Heroes episode "Orientation" in Season 4 and was featured in the 2011 film Detention, with a Grey's Anatomy episode named after it.

Critical reception
AllMusic writer MacKenzie Wilson said that the song "saunters like classic New Order with its dark-hued mechanical energy." Lost At Sea's Sarah Peters put the track alongside "Public Service Announcement" for showing the band's honed-in musicianship and knowledge of new wave, saying that when they "hit the airwaves, there shouldn't be too many listeners impressed by the band's amount of study - why analyze and appreciate when you could just dance?" Adam Moerder of Pitchfork Media found the track to be one of the few standouts on the record, calling it "one of the few sassy moments on the album, with Endicott mockingly singing in falsetto "Don't look at me that way/ It was an honest mistake."

Music video
The video for "An Honest Mistake" was directed by Michael "Mike" Palmieri (Foo Fighters, The Strokes) and features the band performing the song apparently surrounded by a Rube Goldberg machine. The chain starts with several strings of dominoes and includes many other objects, such as light bulbs, eggs, and an aquarium. Different parts of the action are shown from multiple views, often showing it one way, switching to another angle, then switching back to the original view. Eventually a flaming arrow shoots toward a target, but misses to the right.

Track listings

 UK 7-inch single 
A. "An Honest Mistake" – 3:40
B. "Hot Pursuit" (duet version) – 3:04

 UK CD single 
 "An Honest Mistake" – 3:39
 "Hey Sunshiney Day" – 2:27

 UK DVD single 
 "An Honest Mistake" (video)
 "Unconditional" (video)
 The making of "Unconditional"

 Australian CD single 
 "An Honest Mistake"
 "Hey Sunshiney Day"
 "No Breaks"
 "An Honest Mistake" (video)

Charts

Weekly charts

Year-end charts

Release history

References

External links
 

2005 songs
2005 debut singles
The Bravery songs
Island Records singles
Songs written by Sam Endicott